Peter Agricola (June 29, 1525 – July 5 or 7, 1585) was a German Renaissance humanist, educator, classical scholar and theologian, diplomat and statesman, disciple of Martin Luther, friend and collaborator of Philipp Melanchthon.

Successively tutor to several young princes of German sovereign states and rector of schools in Ulm and Lauingen, where he created (1559–1561) and developed the Gymnasium Illustre, he became an important councilor and State minister of the Dukes of Zweibrücken and Palatinate-Neuburg, carrying out many missions in the German Holy Roman Empire and supporting the Protestant Reformation.

Early life

Peter Agricola was born in Holzheim (bei Neu-Ulm) in present-day Baden-Württemberg, a son of Magnus Agricola (Steinheim (Neu-Ulm), ca. 1470 – Holzheim, 1531) and Apollonia Fabricius (Tiefenbach (Neu-Ulm), ? – Holzheim, 1590) and spent his childhood in the area of Ulm.

He was 7 when he lost his father, an innkeeper and judge at Holzheim, and former student at Ingolstadt (Bavaria) who had been a resident in Rome at a Benedictine cardinal's (Jean Bilhères de Lagraulas), planning to join the Benedictine Abbey of Elchingen, but who however - because of the disorders of Rome, nepotism of Pope Alexander VI and war-oriented behavior of future Pope Julius II - enlisted in the imperial troops which were taking part to King Charles VIII of France's war in Italy, during the military operations in the peninsula (1494/95-1497), before he eventually returned to Germany, where he later on showed interest in Martin Luther’s work.

Peter Agricola's mother was a woman of great piety who also showed interest in the Reformation. She made him attend weekly sermons in Ulm and registered him at Ulm high school. As Peter Agricola showed great potential he served as tutor to the children of a rich merchant of the city, who tried to get him hired on a permanent basis in his business, even offering his mother 1,000 ducats in order she agreed but neither Peter Agricola nor his mother wanted to switch from studies for trade.

One of his brothers, Georg Agricola, also went to be soldier in Italy, where he took part to several dangerous military actions, being present at fall of the city of Rome (1527).

Studies

After having received a classical education, becoming proficient in both Latin and Greek, Peter Agricola, then aged 18, left Ulm in 1543 and went to Heidelberg University. He stayed there during one year: registered on March 12, 1543 (as Peter Agricola, von Holzheim), Peter Agricola graduated with a Bachelor of Arts (Bacc.) on June 18, 1544.

He then enlisted at the prestigious and famous Lutheran university of Wittenberg, where he registered (as Petrus Agricola Ulmensis) at the end of September 1544 and on October 9, 1548, and  had Martin Luther as professor and mentor. He earned there a master (Magister) on May 3, 1549, and wanted to become a church minister.

Because of the military disorders however, and following the death of Luther, Peter Agricola left Wittenberg to return in Ulm where he became a teacher (at the end of 1546) before joining Wittenberg university again, achieving his philosophy course there.

Career

Frederick III, reigning duke of Liegnitz in Silesia (now Legnica in Poland), had requested the reformer Philipp Melanchthon to provide him with a tutor for his oldest son, Henry XI of Legnica, then his only son, aged 12. Melanchthon strongly advised with his friend Peter Agricola to accept this position.

Peter Agricola arrived at Liegnitz on April 19, 1550 and was introduced the following day at the castle where he started his new duties. Duke Frederick having served in France in 1551, against the will of Charles V, Holy Roman Emperor, he was stripped of his principality and the young prince Henry, duke of Liegnitz under the regency of his paternal uncle and curator, George II the Pious, duke of Brieg (now Brzeg in Poland), went to reside at Brieg. Peter Agricola followed him there and spent eight years in very good conditions. The prince having become a teenager, he went to the court of Emperor Ferdinand I of the Holy Empire, and his master was thanked with a valuable reward.
 
At the beginning of 1558, Peter Agricola was offered by the Senate of the city of Ulm the position of headmaster of the city Latin school and in spite of his choice to become a church minister he from now on pursued a secular career, stopping planning to become a Lutheran clergyman anymore. He took part in the school reformation project under Ludwig Rabus and in 1559 went to Augsburg where the imperial court then was, to advise Duke Henry XI, his former student (then wine waiter of Ferdinand I and in a difficult situation towards the Emperor). Peter Agricola declined thereafter a new offer to work again for this prince, though the imperial adviser Warnsdorf strongly advised him to do so, and also refused an offer from Hieronymus Wolf to be employed at St. Anne Latin school (Gymnasium bei St. Anna) of Augsburg, as he had been called by Wolfgang of Wittelsbach, duke in Bavaria and reigning Count Palatine of Zweibrücken and Neuburg, to found a school at Lauingen (Bavaria), a challenge he accepted due to the insistence of his close friend and former mate of Wittenberg university, the lawyer and reformer Ulrich Sitzinger, then princely adviser (privy council) and chancellor of the principalities of Palatine Zweibrücken and Palatinate-Neuburg.

He lived there in literary leisure, his charges being paid by the prince, and reformed the schools of the Palatinate of Neuburg. He moreover was named in 1561 tutor to the young princes and future rulers Philip Louis, Count Palatine of Neuburg and John I, Count Palatine of Zweibrücken. He eventually went at war in Hungary under Maximilian II of the Holy Empire with the elder of them (1566). As a reward, Duke Wolfgang gave to him an expensive present, made him Lord of a fee (fief) and Peter Agricola became a member of the prince's Privy Council (1569). In addition, the tutors to the others sons of the reigning duke were placed under his rule. The duke also testified his recognition to Peter Agricola by recommending him in his will, the year preceding his death (1568), as he was so much satisfied of his duties.

Privy Councillor and personal adviser, Peter Agricola became the State minister to the duke's successor, archi-Lutheran Count Palatine (Pfalzgraf) Philip Louis of Neuburg, a position of considerable responsibility. The benefits and favors which he enjoyed at the Court went by increasing and he earned a reputation as an honest and effective public servant. He persuaded the new prince to acquire the Wolfius library for their college.

He undertook diplomatic missions in the Holy Roman Empire and became increasingly influential in the government, welcoming foreigners, drafting official documents, and serving as a liaison between the Duke and other principalities. His position allowed him to defend Lutheran theologians he remained in connection with, and constantly provided them with pieces of advice and the financial help he was able to get for them from several sovereign princes due to his respected reputation.

All throughout his life, Peter Agricola had been in touch with historian and Lutheran theologian David Chytraeus, a friend and former mate at Wittenberg university.

In 1582, Louis VI, Elector Palatine offered him the position of tutor to his son Friedrich IV of the Electorate of the Palatinate (future Elector Palatine), then aged 8, but Peter Agricola preferred to decline by wisdom, because of his already advanced age.

Similarly, the deans of Strasbourg first university (founded by educator Johann Sturm, whom he had welcomed at Lauingen in December 1564) had unsuccessfully negotiated with him, in the hope that he would become one of their academics.

Peter Agricola had got married in 1575 with Diana Clelius († November 24, 1581, aged 47), a daughter to a consul of Lauingen and widow to a privy councillor of Otto-Henry, Elector Palatine, Duke in Bavaria and Count Palatine of Neuburg. She also was the widow of the famous Bohemian mathematician, astrologer and astronomer Cyprián Karásek Lvovický (Cyprianus Leovitius), professor at the Court of Neuburg and one head master of the Gymnasium Illustre. The Sovereigns organized for this happy occasion a splendid wedding party, which party the Duke and Duchess attended in person, and on this occasion they gave as gift to Peter Agricola and his wife a large grace and favour house.

Death

Though he had planned to go to a spa resort in 1585, Peter Agricola was requested by Duke Philip Louis to instead come with him to Düsseldorf at the wedding of the prince's step-brother John William, Duke of Jülich-Cleves-Berg with Jakoba of Baden (daughter to Philibert, Margrave of Baden) during the month of June. He died (apoplexy) in his carriage during the journey back, on the way between Schweinfurt and Ansbach, near the village of Reinsacker (Randersacker) in the vicinity of Würzburg, the last stop. His body was brought to Ochsenfurt and put in a coffin before being buried the next day at Uffenheim (Bavaria) - as it was not possible to bring it back to Neuburg, too far away - in the presence of the duke. Many writings published following his death praised him.

Childless, he was the uncle to Lutheran prelate and theologian Magnus Agricola, his legatee and spiritual successor.

References

 Biography of Peter Agricola (in Latin): Commentatio de M(agister) P(etrus) Agricolae, rectoris quondam Ulmensis vita et meritis, etc / Dissertatio Historico de (...) M(agister) Petri Agricolae / De vita ejus et meritis in scholam, ecclesiam et rempublicam, Johann Franz Wagner, Helmstadt, 1756 (Bibliothecae Bodleianae in Academia Oxoniensi)
 Biography of Peter Agricola (in French): Vie de Pierre Agricola, par M. Wagner (1756) (Bibliothèque nouvelle germanique ou Histoire littéraire de l'Allemagne, de la Suisse et des Pays du Nord, J.H. Samuel Formey, editor: Pierre Mortier, 1758)
 Biography of Peter Agricola (in Latin): Narratio Historica de Vita et Obitu M(agister) Petri Agricolae, Consiliarii Palatini Neuburgici, ac Bipontini, Conscripta à M. Magno Agricola, Pastore gregis Dominici ad B.Mariam Virginem, Neuburgi. IN : Oratio In Obitvm Clarissimi, Atqve Omni Liberali Scientia politissimi viri, ... Petri Agricolae, quondam ... Philippi Lvdovici , & D. Ioannis, Com. Palatinorum Rheni, & Boiariae Ducum, fratrum Praeceptoris, & postea Consiliarij : Habita In Schola Palatinâ Lauinganâ / à S. Ostermanno, I. V. Doctore, eiusdem scholae Rectore, Rev. Bishop Magnus Agricola and Dr. Simon Ostermann, Lauingen, REINMICHEL, 1600
 Biography of Peter Agricola (in Latin) and publication of his writings: Commentarius de Cancellariis et Procancellariis Bipontinis, 1768
 Peter Agricola funeral speech  (in Latin): Oratio in obitum clarissimu, atque omni liberali scientia politissimi viri, Dom(inus) M(agiste)r Petri Agricolae, quondam illustriss(imum) principum D(ominus) Philippi Ludovici, & D(ominus) Iohannis, Com(es) Palatinorum Rheni... fratrum praeceptoris, & postea consiliarii... (Simon Ostermann, Lauingen, Leonhard Reinmichel, 1600)"
 Writings of Peter Agricola: "Aus einem Bericht des Petrus Agricola an Pfalzgraf Philipp Ludwig von Pfalz-Neuburg. Meisenheim 1575 April 10 - Das Domcapitel in Münster sei papistlich gesinnt; in Münster befinde sich ein evan. gelischer Prediger, Da das Capitel freie Wahl habe, so werde es nur einen Bischof wählen, der dem Papst anhängig, falls nicht die Stände des ersteren (...)" (Die Gegenreformation in Westfalen und am Niederrhein: Actenstücke und Erläuterungen, Ludwig Keller, S. Hirzel, 1881)
 "AGRICOLA (Peter), théologien allemand (1525 - 5 juillet 1585)" (Bibliographie biographique universelle: dictionnaire des ouvrages relatifs à l'histoire de la vie publique et privée des personages célèbres de tous les temps et de toutes les nations, Eduard Maria Oettinger, J. J. Stienon, 1854)
 AGRICOLA (Magnus), Nachrichten von Gelehrten, Künstlern und andern merkwürdigen Personen aus Ulm, Albrecht Weyermann, 1829
 "Peter Agricola, ministre de Philippe-Louis de Neuburg" (Le clergé Protestant rhénan au siècle de la Réforme, 1555–1619, Bernard Vogler, Ophrys, 1976)
 "Pour sa succession, les scolarques négocièrent en vain avec Simon Ostermann, le directeur de l'école de Lauingen, et avec Pierre Agricola, le précepteur des princes de Neuburg" (Histoire du Gymnase Jean Sturm, berceau de l'Université de Strasbourg, 1538-1988, Pierre Schang, Oberlin, 1988)
 "AGRICOLA, Peter, M(agister), 1561 Lehr- u. Zuchtmeister f. d. jüng. Söhne d. Herzogs Wolfgang von Zweibrücken, 1583 zweibr. Titularrat" (Die evangelischen Geistlichen der Pfalz seit der Reformation (Pfälzisches Pfarrerbuch), Georg Biundo, Degener 1968)
 "Agricola, Peter Pfalz-neuburgischer Rat. * 29. 6. 1525 Holzheim [Krs. Neu-Ulm, Bay.] als Sohn eines Bauern und Gastwirts" (Melanchthons Briefwechsel, Philipp Melanchthon, Heinz Scheible, Frommann-Holzboog, 1977)
 "Agricola, Peter: Ulmer Schulrektor, Prinzenerzieher am pfälz. Hof - Holzheim, 29. 6. 1525, + Reinacker/Franken, 22. 7. 1585" (Südwestdeutsche Persönlichkeiten: ein Wegweiser zu Bibliographien und biographischen Sammelwerken, Heinrich Ihme, Kohlhammer, 1988)
 "Philipp Ludwig, Pfalzgraf zu Neuburg - Peter Agricola, fürstl. Rath" (Bayerische Geschichte in Zeittafeln: ein Handbuch für Lehrer, Beamte, wie für alle Freunde der Vaterlandskunde, Schmid, 1865)
 "Petrus Agricola, ein berühmter JCtus und Rath den Pfalzgraf Wolffgang" (Historischer Schauplatz Vornehmer und Berühmter Staats- und Rechtsgelehrten, Rüdiger, 1710)
 "Petrus Agricola ward 1561 auf Sitzingers Empfehlung Erzieher der Söhne Wolfgangs, später Erzieher am Neuburger Hofe und zuletzt Neuburgischer Rath" (Vierteljahrschrift für Litteraturgeschichte, Bernhard Seuffert, H. Böhlau, 1974)
 "Der Pfalzgraf Wolfgang liess solches in einem gehaltenen Rathe, welchem der Zweybrückische Statthalter, Quirin Gangolf, Herr zu Geroldseck un Sulz, der Statthalter zu Neuburg, Andreas Fuchs, der Kanzler Johann Stieber, der Licentiat Heinrich Schwebel un M(agister) Peter Agricola beywohneten" (Neueste teutsche Reichs-Geschichte vom Anfange des schmalkaldischen Krieges bis auf unsere Zeiten, F. D. Haberlins, R. K. Freiherr von Senkenberg, Gebauer, 1779)
 "der pfalz-neuburgische Rat Dr. Petrus Agrícola, der Rektor der Fürstlichen Schule Lauingen" (Archiv für Geschichte des Buchwesens, Börsenverein des Deutschen Buchhändels. Historische Kommission, Buchhändler-Vereinigung, 1963
 "mit einem bewundernswürdigen Gedächtnisse begabt, und zuerst der Leitung und dem Unterrichte (...) dem berühmten Peter Agricola zur ferneren Ausbildung übergeben, wurde Herzog Johann ein hochgelehrter Herr, der lateinischen, griechischen und französischen Sprache mächtig, in der Arithmetik, Logik und Rhetorik wohl geübt" (Allgemeine Enzyklopädie der Wissenschaften und Künste, Johann Samuel Ersch, Johann Gottfried Gruber, ..., Gleditsch, 1842)
 "Zu Lehrern hatte (Pfalzgraf Philipp Ludwig von Neuburg) den berühmten Italiäner Immanuel Tremellius, den M(agister) Conrad Marius und M(agister) Peter Agricola, welche ihn in der lateinischen, griechischen und französischen Sprache so weit brachten, dass der kaum achtzehnjährige Prinz zwey lateinische Reden niederschrieb, mit denen er seinem Vater Herzog Wolfgang von Zweybrücken und Neuburg zum neuen Jahre gratulierte" (Denkschriften der Königlichen Akademie der Wissenschaften zu München für das Jahr, Bayerische Akademie der Wissenschaften, 1821)
 "In seiner Kindheit war der reichbegabte Fürstensohn (Philipp Ludwig von Neuburg) von Konrad Marius, seinem Hofmeister, unterrichtet. Als aber dieser wegen seiner Hinneigung zu Calvins Lehre entfernt ward, wurde die Bildung des jungen wissbegierigen Prinzen, besonders dessen eifrige Unterweisung in Luthers Lehre an Peter Agricola übertragen" (Geschichte des Herzogthums Sulzbach: nach seinen Staats- und Religions-Verhältnissen, als wesentlicher Beitrag zur bayerischen Geschichte, G. C. Gack, Weigel, 1847)
 "Philipp Ludwig zum Hofmeister Adam von Galen aus Mochhausen und zum Zucht- un Lehrmeister M(agister) Peter Agricola, der seine Studien in Wittenberg unter Melanchthon gemacht hatte und acht Jahre lang Lehrer des Prinzen Heinrich von Liegnitz gewesen war" (Monumenta Germaniae paedagogica, Gesellschaft für Deutsche Erziehungs- und Schulgeschichte, Hofmann, 1899)
 "Bestallung des Peter Agricola als Zucht- un Lehrmeisters des Prinzen Philipp Ludwig, 30. April 1561" (Geschichte der Erziehung der pfälzischen Wittelsbacher, Friedrich Schmidt, Hofmann, 1899)
 "(...) das des Magisters Petrus Agricola, der der Präzeptor der beiden ältesten Söhne Wolfgangs war" (Wittelsbacher Hausverträge des späten Mittelalters, Uta Spiegel, Hans Rall, Joachim Spiegel, Beck, 1987)
 "Im J. 1566 treffen wir unseren jugendlichen Gelehrten im Donaustädtchen Lauingen, woselbst ihm Peter Agricola, Rath und Prinzeninformator am pfalzgräflich Neuburgischen Hofe, an den er vom Augsburger Rector Wolf gewiesen war" (Allgemeine deutsche Biographie, Bayerische Akademie der Wissenschaften. Historische Kommission, Duncker & Humblot, 1889)
 "Von den fünf Söhnen Wolfgang's erhielt der zweite, Johann I., das Herzogthum Zweibrücken. Im Jahre 1570 gaben die Brüder aus Neue ihres Vaters Kirchenordnung heraus, und Johann erneuerte von Neuburg aus, wo er sich in den ersten Jahren gewöhnlich bei seinem Bruder Phlipp Ludwig aushielt, die Mandate gegen Zwinglianer und Calvinisten. Als er im Jahre 1575, begleitet von Peter Agricola nach Zweibrücken zurücklehrte, wurden die Mandate von der Kanzel verlesen und mehrere calvinisch gestunde Prediger entlassen ; Candidus war dem Agricola ebenfalls "verdächtig", aber er gab seine Zustimmung zu jenen Massregeln. (Real-Enzyklopädie für protestantische Theologie und Kirche: In Verbindung mit vielen protestantischen Theologen und Gelehrten, J. J. Herzog, Besser, 1866)
 "(...) die Öttinger Wolf herleiteten, und von deren Burg Schweinispaind ihm sein berühmter Freund Petrus Agrícola 1571 die Reste gezeigt habe (...) (Peter Agricola, Freund Melanchthons, war 1557-59 Rektor der Lateinschule von Ulm gewesen, dann Hofmeister und Geheimer Rat von Pfalz-Neuburg, wo er die Schulen, u.a. auch im öttingischen, reformiert hat" (Ausstellungskatalog, Öffentliche Bibliothek der Universität Basel, 1992)
 "Nach seinen Erkundigungen — und diese deckten sich mit denen, die Pfalzgraf Philipp Ludwig durch seinen Rat Petrus Agricola hatte anstellen lassen - erschien in Münster z. Z. nur die Wahl eines geweihten, dem Papste anhängigen Bischofs möglich, und Herzog Ernst hatte zudem bereits "weit mehr als E. L. (Erzbischof Heinrich) Vorschub und Beforderung" von Wien und Rom, so daß eine bremische Bewerbung aussichtslos war - Petrus Agricola an Pfalzgraf Philipp Ludwig von Pfalz-Neuburg aus Meisenheim am 10. 4. 1575, Den Hinweis auf die Tätigkeit Agricolas als Erzieher, später als Rat am neuburgischen Hofe entnehme ich A. Englert, Ein zeitgenössisches Urteil über Hans Sachs, in: Vierteljahresschrift für Literaturgeschichte (...)" (Bayerns Weg nach Köln, Günther von Lojewski, L. Röhrscheid, 1962)
 " (...) die postum veröffentlichte "Oratio in obitum clarissimu, atque omni liberali scientia politissimi viri, Dom(inus) M(agiste)r Petri Agricolae, quondam illustriss(imum) principum D(ominus) Philippi Ludovici, & D(ominus) Iohannis, Com(es) Palatinorum Rheni... fratrum praeceptoris, & postea consiliarii... (Lauingen, Leonhard Reinmichel, 1600)", eine Lobrede des Lauinger Rektors Simon Ostermann (ca. 1531 - 1596) auf den 15 Jahre zuvor verstorbenen Petrus Agricola (1525–1585) aus der Gegen von Ulm, der ihn wohl 1564 nach Lauingen geholt hatte. Agricola studierte ab 1543 in Heidelberg, wirkte in Wittenberg und Ulm und wurde 1561 in Neuburg Hofmeister von Philippe Ludwig und dessen Bruder Johann I. Nach der Regierungsübernahme 1569 ernannte ihn Philipp Ludwig zum Geheimen Rat" (Bibliotheken in Neuburg an der Donau: Sammlungen von Pfalzgrafen, Mönchen und Humanisten, Bettina Wagner, Otto Harrassowitz Verlag, 2005
 "Eine enge Beziehung unterhielt Chytraeus zum Hofe des Pfalzgrafen Wolfgang von Pfalz- Zweibrücken ( 1 532- 1 569).93 Als Erzieher der Söhne des Pfalzgrafen wirkte der mit Chytraeus befreundete, aus Ulm stammende Magister Peter Agricola, den Chytraeus von der gemeinsamen Studienzeit in Wittenberg kannte. Mit ihm trat Chytraeus - anscheinend nach längerer Zeit - wieder in Verbindung, indem er dem alten Freund 1558 eine neu erschienene Schrift, eine Einführung in das Studium der Theologie, widmete. Von da an scheint die Verbindung mit Agricola nicht mehr abgebrochen zu sein. - Agricola wurde im September 1544 in Wittenberg immatrikuliert (...) nennt ihn 1561 als Lehr- und Zuchtmeister der jüngeren Söhne des Pfalzgrafen Wolfgang, 1583 als zweibrückenschen Titularrat. Biundo will ihn zu Unrecht - wohl in Unkenntnis der Verbindung mit Chytraeus und des Wittenberger Matrikeleintrags - mit einem Heidelberger Studenten Peter Agricola aus Holzheim identifizieren. - Zu nennen ist hier noch ein undartiertes, doch in das Jahr 1569, gehörendes Schreiben von Chystraeus an Agricola, in dem er von seiner Tätigkeit in Österreich berichtet (...). Am 13. Juli 1584 bestätigt Chystraeus, von Agricola fünf Briefe erhalten zu haben." (David Chytraeus (1530–1600): norddeutscher Humanismus in Europa ; Beiträge zum Wirken des Kraichgauer Gelehrten, Karl-Heinz Glaser, Steffen Stuth, Verlag Regionalkultur, 2000)
 " (...) sie gerne gemeinsam mit den neuburgischen nach Kursachsen übersenden wolle. Die Bitte blieb erfolglos, was Philipp Ludwig (Pfalzgraf) in zunehmende Verlegenheit brachte gegenüber den immer dringlicher werdenden Mahnschreiben Kurfürst Augusts. Ein erneuter Brandbrief aus Kursachsen von Anfang April seinen Rat Petrus Agricola nach Zweibrücken zu entsenden. Agricola schien für diese Mission besonders geeignet, da er der Lehrer der beiden jungen Fürsten gewesen war und darüber hinaus das besondere Vertrauen Johanns genoß. Nach seinem Eintreffen in Zweibrücken bekam es Agricola aber sehr bald zu spüren, daß Johann inzwischen nicht nur unter dem Einfluß (...) - In Neuburg war der spätere Vorkämpfer des Calvinismus aber einigen strengen Lutheranern (z.B. Peter Agricola) bereits als Philippist verdächtig - (...) 1575 zusammen mit Herzog Johann und dem neuburgischen Rat Peter Agricola (Ulmer Landeskind) ins Land kam, war schon die Rede - Für die außerordentlichen Qualitäten der drei Zucht- und Lehrmeister der zwei Brüder - Dr.theol. Immanuel Tremellius (1559/1561 Rektor in Hornbach, 1561/1577 als Calvinist, Prof . für AT in Heidelberg, danach in Sedan), Konrad Marius (1561 als Calvinist verhaftet, danach Kirchenrat in Heidelberg) und Peter Agricola (später Professor in Lauingen und neuburgischer Rat) - sowie die sorgfältigen Instruktionen Wolfgangs sprechen die glänzenden Zeugnisse an Gelehrsamkeit, die insbesondere Johann mehrfach öffentlich ablegte. Schon an der Zweibrücker Hofschule brillierte er als Jahrgangsbester. Bei dem Examen, das der Straßburger Rektor Johann Sturm im Dezember 1564 am Lauinger Gymnasium abhielt, bewiesen Johann und Philipp Ludwig dann solche Kenntnisse in den Hauptstücken der christlichen Lehre, der lateinischen griechischen und französischen Sprachen, wie auch der Logic, Rhetoric, Arithmetic und Historie abgelegt." (Blätter für württembergische Kirchengeschichte, M. Holland, 1982))
 "Einer Anzahl hervorragender Humanisten gedenkt Friedrich Schmidt in seiner "Geschichte der Zrziehung der pflälzischen Wittersbacher". (Dr) Johannes Reuchlin wird (1497) als „oberster Zuchtmeister" der Söhne des Kurfürsten Philipp bestellt, Johann Oekolampadius wird (1506) Erzieher der Prinzen Heinrich und Wolfgang, gang, Peter Agricola übernimmt (1561) die Führung des Prinzen Philippe Ludwig, des Strassburger Rektor Johann Sturm wird (1564) bei der Organisation der Gymnasien zu Hornbach und Lauingen zu Rate gezogen." (Kritischer Jahresbericht über die Fortschritte der Romanischen Philologie, Karl Vollmüller, Richard Otto, R. Oldenbourg, 1903)
 "(...) des Concordienwerkes war, ist nicht zu zweifeln, dass seine Antwort die Verweigerung der Unterschrift empfahl, und demgemäss muss der Rat des Pfalzgrafen beschieden haben, da der glaubenseifrige und streng lutherisch gesinnte Herr es notwendig fand, seinen Hofrat Peter Agrícola mit einem neuen Schreiben nach Donauwörth zu senden. Auch jetzt erreichte er indes nicht sein Ziel." (Beiträge zur bayerischen Kirchengeschichte, Fr. Junge, 1895)
 "Praezeptoren waren Emmanuel Tremmellio, Conrad Marius und Peter Agricola; daneben fehlten natürlich nicht die Fecht-, Reit- und Tanzstunden. Der junge Prinz besuchte auch das von seinem Vater, Pfalz-Neuburg überlassen hatte, gegründete "Gymnasium illustre" in Lauingen an der Donau. Jener ließ es 1561 nach dem Hornbacher Muster einrichten und mit trefflichen Professoren besetzen. Später, als Landesherr, hat Philipp Ludwig dieser Hohen Schule, welche bewußt als protestantisches Pendant zur katholischen Universität in Dillingen an der Donau gestiftet worden war, seine ganze Aufmerksamkeit, Förderung und Liebe zugewendet. Bezog doch der Herzog von hier seine Pastoren, Pädagogen und juristischen Hofbeamten." (Lebensbilder aus dem bayerischen Schwaben, Götz Pölnitz (Freiherr von), M. Hueber, 1952)
 "Im folgenden Jahre (1566) erhielt er durch die Vermittlung von Peter Agricola (1525-1585), des Rates und Prinzeninformators am Pfalzgräflich Neuburgischen Hof, eine Stelle als Professor am angesehenen Gymnasium von Lauingen" (Die Copernicus-Biographien des 16. bis 18. Jahrhunderts - Texte und Übersetzungen, Nicolaus Copernicus, Heribert M. Nobis, Andreas Kühne, Akademie Verlag, 2004)
 "30.04.1561 - In der Bestallungsurkunde des Magister Petrus Agricola zum Zucht- und Lehrmeister des Kurpfälzischen Prinzen Philipp Ludwig heißt es, Agricola solle den Prinzen zur „Übung in lateinischer und französischer Sprache" anhalten" (Linguarum recentium annales: der Unterricht in den modernen europäischen Sprachen im deutschsprachigen Raum, Konrad Schröder, 1985)
 "(...) der Superattendent Mag(ister) Abraham Manne von Lauingen, dem der fürstl. Rat Mag(ister) Petrus Agricola als politucus beigegeben war [1934] - Die Schrift Johann Sturms über das Schulwesen in Lauingen aus dem Jahre 1565 weist schon im Titel auf die Widmung an die Pfalzgrafen Philipp Ludwig und Johann, Söhne des Pfalzgrafen Wolfgang hin. In der Widmungsvorrede berichtet Sturm: als er im Dezember in Neuburg a. d. Donau gewesen sein und den Eifer der Pfalzgrafen und ihres Lehrers Peter Agricola kennengelernt habe, sei er über so vieles von Bewunderung erfüllt worden, daß er (...)" [1953] (Reformationsgeschichtliche Studien und Texte, Aschendorffsche Verlagsbuchhandlung)
 "Auch der Fürst (Wolfgang) schickte seine beiden Söhne, Philipp Ludwig und Johann, mit ihrem Hofmeister Peter Agricola (zwischen 1561 un 1569) zu den Studien nach Lauingen (M[agister] Agricola, dem Rector) - Den Plan zur Einrichtung des Gymnasiums hatte der Fürst durch den als Schulmann berühmten Johann Sturm, damaligen Professor und Rector zu Strassburg, eigens entwerfen lassen" (Das Gymnasium Illustre oder die pfalzgräflich Neuburgische Landesschule zu Lauingen vom Jahre 1561 - 1616, Carl Clesca, Rindfleisch, 1848)
  "Johann Sturm arbeitete in Lauingen besonders eng mit dem zweiten Rektor der Schule, dem Juristen Simon Ostermann zusammen. Er lernte auch den Neuburger Prinzenerzieher Petrus Agricola kennen un empfahl ihn gelegentlich den heimischen Scholarchen für eine Berufung nach Strassburg - (...) Der Nachfolge wegen verhandelten die Scholarchen vergeblich mit dem Lauinger Schulrektor Simon Ostermann und mit dem Neuburger Prinzererzieher Petrus Agricola." (Humanistische Hochschule und freie Reichsstadt, Anton Schindling, Zabern, 1977)
 "(Herzog) Wolfgang (...) liess seine älteren zwei Prinzen, Johann undPhlipp aus ersterer, von dem gelehrten Schulrektor Sturm, und ihrem Präceptor Agricola erziehen" (Genealogische Lebens-Skizzen der Vorfahren des bayerischen Königshauses bis auf Otto den Groe︣n von Wittelsbach (von Vater auf Sohn), Nathanael von Schlichtegroll, Rösl, 1842)
 "Sturm hatte einem öffentlichen Examen beigewohnt, das im Dezember 1564 in Neuburg von ihrem Lehrer Peter Agricola mit ihnen abgehalten worden war; er rühmt die Kenntnisse, die sie in der lateinischen und griechischen Grammatik, im Übersetzen der Schriftsteller, in der Religion, in der Weltgeschichte ("bis auf die Gegenwart und den letzten Kaiser"), in der Dialektik und Rhetorik, in der Rechenkunst und, am zweiten Tage, im lateinischen Stil und im Französischen an den Tag gelegt haben (quod vobis Germanico vestitu propositum guit, id Romana veste subito ornatum atque togatum reddidistis). Dann fordert er sie auf, der neuen Schule, die ihr Vater gegründet, obwohl er schon ein Gymnasium in Hornebach mit grossen Rosten unterhalte, alle Pflege angedeihen zu lassen." (Geschichte der Erziehung vom Anfang an bis auf unsere Zeit, Karl Adolf Schmid, J.G. Cotta, 1892)
 " (...) Petrus Agricola, Hofmeister der Söhne des Pfalzgrafens Wolfgang, Joannes Sturmius, welcher Methodum in docendo prascriptam, & in schola Laugingana observatam'', dann die vom Pfalzgrafen Wolfgang dieser Schule gegebene Gesetze schön beschrieben hat" (Historisch-Topographische Beschreibung des Herzogthums Neuburg, Johann Nepomuk Anton von Reisach, Montag, 1780)
 "Der berühmte Strassburger Rektor Johann Sturm, der vielfach einen Reformationen Einfluss auf das süddeutsche Schulwesen ausübte und auch bei der Organisation der von Pfalzgraf Wolfgang in Hornbach und Lauingen gegründete Gymnasien beteiligt war, überzeugte sich bei Gelegenheit eines Aufenthales in Neuburg von den Forschritten der Prinzen in den verschiedenen Wissenschaften, worüber er sich in der Vorrede zu seiner im Jahre 1564 über die Stiftung der Lauingischen Schule herausgegebenen Schrift ausführlich in anerkennendsten Worten ausspricht - Sturm, Johann: Scholae Lauinganae, Lauingen, 1565". (Geschichte der erziehung der pfälzischen Wittelsbacher, Friedrich Schmidt, A. Hofmann, 1899)

1525 births
1585 deaths
German Lutheran theologians
People from Neu-Ulm
German Renaissance humanists
People of the Protestant Reformation
German male non-fiction writers